The Seer is a young adult science fiction novel by David Stahler Jr. It is the second book in the Truesight trilogy, and is followed by Otherspace.

Plot
After leaving Harmony, Jacob is following the trail to find Delaney Carrow, a girl presumed dead. By homing in on her sounder, he meets Xander, an ex-mercenary for the Mixel corporation. Xander initially gives Jacob a hard time, but as the weeks pass, he warms to the kid he calls "blinder". 
Jacob, once again homing in on Delaney's sounder, discovers that Xander has it. When he confronts Xander (using a kitchen knife of all things) he discovers that Xander had given Delaney a ride, and left her on the doorsteps of Mixel. In desperation, Jacob begs Xander to take him to Melville, to see if he can find Delaney. Xander is against it at first, but he eventually caves in and takes him to Mixel tower, where they discover that Delaney has become a pop-star, and has also been changed; given artificial eyes so that she can see. But Delaney is not happy. In truth, she is a prisoner in Mixel tower, and Jacob hatches a plan with Xander to free her from Mixel.

Later, Jacob starts having visions, first about Delaney and Harmony, but later on, bits and pieces of these visions come true, and he realizes that he is starting to be able to see future events. With this new power, he is able to get his companions out of difficult situations. One night, he has a vision of a boy telling him that there are people like him out there, Blinders turned Seers. However, the message garbles before Jacob can hear the location of the colony, so Jacob decides to revisit Harmony to seek answers.

Upon returning to Harmony, Jacob and Delaney pay a visit to the high councilor's house where Delaney tells her father of her return. The high councilor tries to strangle his daughter, but is presumably killed by Jacob, and she escapes while Jacob heads to the ghostbox. He begins asking the ghostbox if there are other people like him out there. The ghostbox then tells Jacob that there are others like him, people who were born blind and have gained the ability to see (called "abominations" by the ghostbox), who were supposed to be killed rather than simply having their sight taken away as Jacob believed before. Jacob then proceeds to ask the ghostbox where the other escaped Seers might be, and discovers from the machine that they could on the colony of Tieresias. Eventually, he is detected by listeners who chase him throughout Harmony. They fail to catch him, and he and his companions make a hasty escape away from the colony.

2007 American novels
American young adult novels
American science fiction novels
2007 science fiction novels
Children's science fiction novels
Eos Books books